Tomáš Horák (born 3 August 1998) is a Slovak professional footballer who plays as a forward.

Club career

FC ViOn Zlaté Moravce
Horák made his Fortuna Liga debut for ViOn Zlaté Moravce against Tatran Liptovský Mikuláš on 12 February 2022.

References

External links
 FC ViOn Zlaté Moravce official club profile 
 
 Futbalnet profile 
 Fortuna Liga profile 

1998 births
Living people
Slovak footballers
Association football forwards
FC Slovan Galanta players
FC ViOn Zlaté Moravce players
5. Liga players
3. Liga (Slovakia) players
Slovak Super Liga players